DIEMA is a Bulgarian television channel, part of Nova Broadcasting Group, owned by United Group. The channel airs mainly films, action series. Along with Nova Sport and Diema Sport airs sports, including matches from the English FA Premier League,  the FA Cup and the UEFA European Football Championship qualifications, as well as the England national football team home matches.

History
Diema Vision was founded on 15 May 1999 by Emil Slavchev, Anatoli Belchev and Asen Radulov. The first owned channel was Diema +. Over the years the channel proved popular, and the company launched a second channel - Diema 2. At the end of 2005 it was sold to Apace Media, owned by Kamen Vodenicharov. In March 2007 Diema Vision became part of Balkan Media Group Limited, a joint venture between Apace Media Group UK and the international entertainment-broadcasting group Modern Times Group MTG AB and re-branded the main channel only as Diema, dropping the "plus" from its name. In March 2009, MTG announced an agreement that would see the assets of Balkan Media Group Limited merge with the newly acquired Nova television. On 12 September 2011, the channel changed its look and logo again alongside the other Nova TV channels.

Logos

References

Television channels and stations established in 1999
Bulgarian-language television stations
1999 establishments in Bulgaria
Television networks in Bulgaria
Movie channels in Bulgaria
Modern Times Group